The Little Book of Cannabis: How Marijuana Can Improve Your Life is a 2018 nonfiction book about cannabis by Canadian journalist Amanda Siebert, published by Greystone Books. It was the bestselling nonfiction book about cannabis in Canada as of early 2019. A Winnipeg Free Press review stated that the book "avoid[s] being preachy" and "compassionately guides readers through ten areas where cannabis could have therapeutic benefits".

Siebert's November 20, 2018 pro-legalization of cannabis op-ed in The New York Times and her authorship of The Little Book of Cannabis were noted by Nonprofit Quarterly.

See also 
List of books about cannabis

References

Sources

Further reading 

2018 non-fiction books
Canadian non-fiction books
Non-fiction books about cannabis
Canadian books about cannabis